Caledonian Football Club was a Scottish football club from the city of Inverness, Highland. It played in the Highland Football League until 1994, when it merged with Inverness Thistle to form Inverness Caledonian Thistle.

Formation
Caledonian Football Club was formed in 1885. They were founder members of the Highland Football League in 1893 and wore strips of blue shirts, white shorts and blue socks. Their home ground was Telford Street Park, located beside the Caledonian Canal, and they were known by the nickname Caley.

History
Caledonian won the Highland Football League a record eighteen times. Another Inverness side, Clachnacuddin, equalled this record in 2004. The club's greatest period of league and cup success was in the early 1980s when they won three successive titles under manager Alex Main, a journalist who also wrote the club's centenary book 'Caley All The Way – The First Hundred Years' in 1986. The club won the prestigious Rothmans Football Yearbook Award for outstanding non-league club in 1981–82, Rothmans describing them as one of the outstanding teams of their grade in Britain, let alone Scotland. In 1982–83 their Highland League record of won 23, drew 7, lost 0, made them the first of only two clubs in the postwar era (the other being Brora Rangers in 2014–15) to finish the season as unbeaten champions.

Caledonian, like other Highland League clubs, were prevented from making the step up to the Scottish Football League due to the lack of a pyramid system.

Despite this, they qualified for the Scottish Cup many times, knocking-out larger League clubs on a total of 19 occasions. Notable achievements included knocking out First Division Airdrieonians in 1990 and in 1992 embarking on a run to the fourth round, defeating league sides Stenhousemuir (4–1), Clyde (3–1), before taking Premier Division St Johnstone to a replay, eventually losing 3–0 in Perth in front of a crowd of 10,000.

The last Caledonian game was against Huntly on Saturday 14 May 1994 at Christie Park, Huntly. The match ended 1–1 with Wilson Robertson scoring the Caley goal.

Kit History

Merger with Inverness Thistle
In 1993, the Scottish Football League decided to expand and restructure. This meant that two vacancies for membership would be available. Caledonian decided to apply for membership, as did city rivals Inverness Thistle. The SFL suggested that a joint application might be more successful and the boards of Caley and Thistle decided to merge. This decision was met with widespread opposition by supporters of both sides, especially by Caley fans who were confident their club could successfully bid on their own. However, an amalgamation went ahead.  The new club, Caledonian Thistle (later Inverness Caledonian Thistle), were granted membership to the Third Division at the beginning of season 1994–95.

Players

Club
Formed 1885; Defunct 1994 – By amalgamation of Caledonian F.C. and Inverness Thistle to form: Caledonian Thistle – shortly afterwards renamed Inverness Caledonian Thistle
Ground: Telford Street Park
Colours: Royal blue shirts, white shorts, royal blue socks

Honours
Highland Football League – 1895/96, 1898/99, 1899/1900, 1901/02, 1910/11, 1913/14, 1925/26, 1930/31, 1950/51, 1951/52, 1963/64, 1970/71, 1976/77, 1977/78, 1981/82, 1982/83, 1983/84, 1987/88
Scottish Qualifying Cup (North) – 1948/49, 1949/50, 1950/51, 1961/62, 1966/67, 1969/70, 1971/72, 1981/82, 1982/83, 1983/84, 1986/87, 1987/88, 1991/92
North of Scotland Cup – 1889/90, 1891/92, 1896/97, 1901/02, 1910/11, 1911/12, 1921/22, 1924/25, 1925/26, 1927/28, 1933/34, 1950/51, 1951/52, 1973/74, 1974/75, 1976/77, 1981/82, 1983/84, 1985/86, 1993/94
Highland League Cup – 1951/52, 1968/69, 1970/71, 1975/76, 1976/77
Bells Cup – 1974/75, 1975/76, 1978/79
Inverness Cup – 1895/96, 1896/97, 1898/99, 1899/1900, 1901/02, 1907/08, 1910/11, 1911/12, 1912/13, 1913/14, 1920/21, 1922/23, 1925/26, 1963/64, 1977/78, 1982/83, 1984/85, 1986/87, 1988/89

Reserve Honours 

 North of Scotland Junior/2nd XI Cup - 1892–93, 1894–95, 1895–96, 1899–1900, 1904–05, 1905–06, 1906–07, 1921–22, 1947–48, 1948–49, 1954–55, 1959–60, 1965–66, 1970–71, 1988–89, 1990–91

References

 
Former Highland Football League teams
Inverness Caledonian Thistle F.C.
Defunct football clubs in Scotland
Association football clubs established in 1885
Association football clubs disestablished in 1994
Football clubs in Inverness
1885 establishments in Scotland
1994 disestablishments in Scotland